Matthew Kale Snider (born on January 26, 1976, in Des Moines, Iowa) is a former American football fullback. He graduated from the University of Richmond in 1999 with a Bachelor of Arts in Sports Science and Health. The Carolina Panthers offered him an NFL free agent contract in the spring of 1999. He spent the summer in Charlotte and went through three mini-camps with the club, but they released him after the third. The Green Bay Packers then offered him a two-year contract in July 1999, and Snider made the roster as the back-up fullback and special teams performer after coming into camp as the fourth-string fullback. One highlight of his career at Green Bay was a preseason 66-yard touchdown reception at Lambeau Field.

He played two seasons for Green Bay, who released him at the start of the 2001 season. The Minnesota Vikings picked him up soon after. Snider played four games with the Vikings before they released him, and for the rest of the 2001 season he was not on a roster. The newly formed Houston Texans signed Snider as a free agent in December 2001, making him one of the first ten players the franchise ever signed. The Texans released Snider after training camp in August 2002, ending his NFL career.

Snider graduated from Lower Merion High School in Ardmore, Pennsylvania, a suburb outside of Philadelphia, in 1994. He played football and basketball for the Lower Merion Aces, and he played two years of high school basketball with Kobe Bryant. In 1994, Snider's senior season and Bryant's sophomore season, he and Bryant were named team MVPs for the season. Snider was also named to the first-team all Philadelphia Main Line roster.

Snider now lives in San Diego and works as a personal trainer with private clients in downtown San Diego and at Frog's Fitness in Solana Beach, California and Santaluz Country Club in Rancho Santa Fe, California.

References

External links

American football fullbacks
Living people
1976 births
Green Bay Packers players
Minnesota Vikings players
Richmond Spiders football players
Players of American football from Des Moines, Iowa
Lower Merion High School alumni